The Hirschberg is a  mountain in the Bavarian Fore-alps south of Lake Tegernsee.

The summit may be reached via a gentle mountain path either from Scharling, Kreuth or Bad Wiessee, all three routes being classified as not difficult. Below the summit at a height of 1,520 m is the Hirschberghaus restaurant, which is open all-year. The Hirschberg is the Tegernsee's observation point with an extensive panorama in all directions of the compass. In winter it is climbed by skiers from Kreuth via the Rauheck Alm or on foot from Scharling. The path is a gentle walk via the toboggan run (Rodelbahn) as far as Hirschlacke, then becomes steep and, in places, icy as it runs along the so-called Kratzer to the Hirschberghaus and finally along the open ridge to the summit. The summer route is susceptible to avalanches in winter and should not be used at that time of year.

The aforementioned Kratzer is a 1,544 m high sub-peak of the Hirschberg with a summit cross and the Hirschberghaus.

External links 
 Hirschberg mountain walks – route description with photographs 
 Hirschberg ski tour – route description with photographs 
 Steinmandl tour descrioption 

Mountains of the Alps
Mountains of Bavaria
Bavarian Prealps